Sven Erland Valter Sköld (12 February 1910 – 12 December 1975) was a Swedish footballer who played as a defender. He made eight appearances for the Sweden national team from 1935 to 1938. He was also part of Sweden's squad for the football tournament at the 1936 Summer Olympics, but he did not play in any matches.

References

External links
 

1910 births
1975 deaths
Swedish footballers
Association football defenders
Sweden international footballers